My Rowdy Angel is a 2018 Burmese romantic-comedy film, directed by Win Lwin Htet starring Hlwan Paing, Khin Wint Wah, Yan Aung, Kyaw Thu, Htun Htun, Htoo Aung, Yell Htwe Aung, Thu Ta Aung and Khaing Thazin Ngu Wah. The film, produced by Media 7 Film Production premiered Myanmar on December 28, 2018.

Cast

Main cast
Hlwan Paing as David
Khin Wint Wah as Bella
Yan Aung as Sports coach of school
Kyaw Thu as Owner of arena
Tun Tun Examplez as Rowdy Angel
Htoo Aung as Bala Gyi
Yell Htwe Aung as Ye Htway
Thu Ta Aung as Thu Ta
Khaing Thazin Ngu Wah as Ngu Wah
Kin Kaung as School bus driver

Guest cast
Thinzar Wint Kyaw
Khay Sett Thwin
Su Lin Shein

References

2018 films
2010s Burmese-language films
Burmese romantic comedy films
Films shot in Myanmar
2018 romantic comedy films